The Nelson Report was a daily communiqué of international events, though focused on Asia, aimed at the political audience in Washington, D.C. It was run and edited by Christopher Nelson. It was started in 1983.

References

Political magazines published in the United States
Magazines established in 1983